Associação Desportiva Leônico, commonly known as Leônico, is a Brazilian football team from Salvador. They won the Campeonato Baiano once and competed in the Série A two times.

History
They were founded on April 3, 1940. Leônico won the Campeonato Baiano in 1966. The club competed in the Série A in 1979 and in 1985.

Stadium
They play their home games at the Edgard Santos stadium, located in Simões Filho. The stadium has a maximum capacity of 5,000 people. They played in the 1990s at Estádio José Trindade Lobo, a stadium located in Santo Antônio de Jesus. This stadium has a maximum capacity of 4,000 people.

Achievements

 Campeonato Baiano:
 Winners (1): 1966

References

Association football clubs established in 1940
Football clubs in Bahia
1940 establishments in Brazil